Sreekumar Krishnan Nair (born 17 June), often credited on screen as K. Sreekuttan) is an Indian filmmaker, best known for directing the 1993 film O' Faby,  which was India's first full-length live action/animation hybrid feature film. He is the youngest son of prolific south Indian filmmaker M. Krishnan Nair and younger brother of Retired Indian Administrative Service
officer, poet and lyricist K. Jayakumar.

Prior to making films as a director, Sreekumar served as an A.D. (First Assistant Director, Second-Unit Director and Chief Associate Director) under prominent South Indian filmmaker, Hariharan. His stint with director Hariharan was more than a decade long, working on seventeen films together, among which eight were scripted by 'Padma Bhushan' awardee and Jnanpith laureate M. T. Vasudevan Nair, one of the greatest scenarists in Indian film history. He was the Chief Associate Director of the Indian classic Oru Vadakkan Veeragatha. He has also directed several television commercials and documentaries.

He was commissioned to direct the epic historical film Marthanda Varma in 2011, filmed simultaneously in English and Malayalam (spoken in the Indian state of Kerala and the surrounding area). The project eventually got shelved. He subsequently served as the strategy director of Tecgemini.

He is currently the CEO of the streaming media and video-on-demand platform .

Filmography

As director

As Second-Unit Director / Chief Assistant Director
All films in Malayalam language except were noted.

References

External links
 

Living people
People from Thiruvananthapuram district
Malayalam film directors
Film directors from Kerala
Filmmaking pioneers
1961 births